Laurali Rose "Bunny" Wright (née Appleby) (5 June 1939 – 25 February 2001) was a Canadian writer of mainstream fiction and mystery novels. Many of her stories are set on the coast of British Columbia.

Early life and education

Wright was born in Saskatoon, Saskatchewan. She was educated at Carleton, the University of Calgary, UBC, and later at Simon Fraser University (Master of Arts in Liberal Studies, 1995).

Career
In 1959, Wright worked as a journalist at the Fraser Valley Record; she wrote for the Saskatoon Star Phoenix, but her first article was for The Globe and Mail about being a teenager in Germany. She later moved to Calgary, where she was mentored by W.O. Mitchell. She worked in California for advertising agency.

While in Vancouver, Wright met John Wright. The two were married, and she spent time as an actor with her husband, including a stint doing summer stock in Dawson City.  She worked for several years as a journalist at the Calgary Herald, eventually becoming Assistant City Editor, before turning to full-time writing in 1977.

Wright published her first novel, Neighbours, in 1979. Her earliest novels were literary fiction; after the publication of The Suspect (1985), her first mystery novel and winner of the 1986 Edgar Award for Best Novel, she concentrated almost exclusively on the genre. One further work of literary fiction, Love in the Temperate Zone, appeared in 1988.

In addition to the Edgar Award, Wright received the Arthur Ellis Award and wrote several adaptations of her novels for CBC Radio.  Her novels have been published and distributed throughout the world in several languages. The Suspect has been adapted for the stage and, at various times, the "Alberg and Cassandra" series has been optioned for film and television.

Personal
Wright rarely used her given names for any purpose. She published all her novels as L. R. Wright (except in the US, where she appeared as Laurali Wright), and was known as Bunny in her personal life.  She and husband John Wright had two daughters.

Wright died of breast cancer in Vancouver, British Columbia on February 25, 2001.

Bibliography
The Alberg and Cassandra Mysteries
The Suspect (1985)
Sleep While I Sing (1986)
A Chill Rain in January (1990)
Fall From Grace (1991)
Prized Possessions (1993)
A Touch of Panic (1994)
Mother Love (1995)
Strangers Among Us (1996)
Acts of Murder (1997)
The Edwina Henderson Mysteries 
Kidnap (2000)
Menace (2001)
Other novels
Neighbours (1979)
The Favorite (1982)
Among Friends (1984)
Love in the Temperate Zone (1988)

References

External links
www.lrwright.com

1939 births
2001 deaths
20th-century Canadian novelists
Deaths from breast cancer
Deaths from cancer in British Columbia
Canadian mystery writers
Edgar Award winners
Canadian women novelists
Writers from Saskatoon
Women mystery writers
20th-century Canadian women writers
Canadian women non-fiction writers
21st-century Canadian novelists
21st-century Canadian women writers
20th-century Canadian journalists